Mrs Bardell may refer to:

Martha Bardell, a fictional landlady in Charles Dickens' The Pickwick Papers (1836/37)
Martha Bardell, a fictional landlady of Sexton Blake, created by William Murray Graydon in 1905, and who appeared in hundreds of novels and adaptations